The Champ is the 13th album by country singer Moe Bandy, released in 1980 on the Columbia label recorded at Jack Clement Recording Studio "B" and Woodland Sound Studios.

Track listing
"The Champ" (Dave Kirby, Warren Robb) - 2:29
"The Cowboy's a Kitten at Home" (Jimmy Mundy, Peggy White) - 2:04
"The Wild Side of Life" (William Warren, Arlie A. Carter) - 3:07
"Beethoven Was Before My Time" (J. Dycks) - 2:30
"The Giver Took All She Could Stand" (Bobby P. Barker) - 2:39
"Yesterday Once More" (Jimmy Mundy, Peggy White) - 2:58
"I Just Can't Leave These Honky Tonks Alone" (Virgil Warner, Ernie Rowell) - 2:13
"She Took Out The Outlaw in Me" (Jimmy Mundy, Peggy White) - 2:20
"Like Some Good Ol' Boy" (Virgil Warner) - 2:05
"Accidentally On Purpose Tonight" (Pat Bunch, Peggy White) - 2:54

Musicians
Hargus "Pig" Robbins
Henry Strzelecki
Leo Jackson
 Weldon Myrick 
Dave Kirby
Johnny Gimble
Ray Edenton
Kenny Malone
Leon Rhodes
Charlie McCoy
Bob Moore
Buddy Spicher
Wayne Jackson

Backing
The Jordanaires
Laverna Moore.

Production
Sound engineers - Billy Sherrill, Harold Lee, Les Ladd
Photography - Slick Lawson
Design - Team-Johnson

References

1980 albums
Moe Bandy albums
Columbia Records albums
Albums produced by Ray Baker (music producer)